Colne is a town in Lancashire, England.

Colne may also refer to:

Villages
Colne, Cambridgeshire, England
The Colnes, four villages in northern Essex, England based around the local river
Colne Engaine
Earls Colne
Wakes Colne
White Colne

Rivers
River Colne, Essex, England
River Colne, Hertfordshire, England
River Colne, West Yorkshire, England

Organisations
Colne F.C., a football club from Colne in Lancashire
Colne Dynamoes F.C., a defunct football club from the same town

Other uses
 Colne Valley (UK Parliament constituency)
 Nelson and Colne (UK Parliament constituency)
 SS Colne, a freight vessel

See also
 Kolnes, a village in Norway